Scott Lipsky and Rajeev Ram were the defending champions but Lipsky decided not to participate.
Ram plays alongside Dustin Brown, losing in the first round.
Andre Begemann and Alexandre Kudryavtsev won the title against James Cerretani and Adil Shamasdin 6–3, 3–6, [11–9].

Seeds

Draw

Draw

References
 Main Draw

Bauer Watertechnology Cup - Doubles
2011 Doubles